Sir Alexander Michael Graham GBE (born 27 September 1938) is a former Lord Mayor of London. He served from 1990 to 1991.

Graham has also served as an alderman and as Sheriff of the City of London. From 2000 to 2013, he served as Gentleman Usher of the Purple Rod.

He went to St. Paul's School London from 1951 to 1956

Before assuming the office of Lord Mayor, he was made Knight Grand Cross of the Order of the British Empire (GBE) with effect from 9 October 1990.

He is married to Lady Carolyn Graham and they have three daughters.

His brother is Lieutenant General Sir Peter Graham, a former General Officer Commanding Scotland.

References

1938 births
Living people
Councilmen and Aldermen of the City of London
Knights Grand Cross of the Order of the British Empire
20th-century lord mayors of London
20th-century English politicians
Sheriffs of the City of London